Stenella lythri is a species of anamorphic fungi.

References

External links

Images by ForestryImages

lythri
Fungi described in 1975